Acrobasis normella is a species of snout moth in the genus Acrobasis. It was described by Harrison Gray Dyar Jr. in 1908, and is known from Ontario, Canada, and central and eastern United States.

The larvae feed on Corylus americana and Corylus cornuta.

References

Moths described in 1908
Acrobasis
Moths of North America